David Neal may refer to:

David Neal (actor) (1932–2000), British actor
David Neal (British Army officer) Independent Chief Inspector of Borders and Immigration (UK)
David Neal (cricketer) (born 1951), New Zealand cricketer
David Dalhoff Neal (1838–1915), American artist